Victoria Meyer-Laker (born 18 March 1988) is a British professional rower and a member of the Great Britain Rowing Team.

Career

2009
In 2009, she rowed in the British eight and was 7th in her first International regatta, the European Championships in Brest, Belarus.

2010
In 2010, she was 7th in the Women's quadruple sculls at the World Rowing U23 Championships in Brest, Belarus.

2011
Meyer-Laker competed in the British women's eight at the 2011 European Rowing Championships in Plovdiv, Bulgaria, and finished 4th.

2012
At the 2012 European Rowing Championships in Varese, Italy, she won a bronze medal with the women's eight.

At the World Rowing Cup in Belgrade, she won a bronze medal in the women's eight.

2013

In April 2013 Meyer-Laker finished sixth in the women's single scull at the GB Rowing Team Trials held at the Redgrave Pinsent Rowing Lake, Caversham, Berkshire.

Teamed with Frances Houghton in the women's double scull, she won a bronze medal at the World Rowing Cup event at Penrith Lakes, Australia in January, and a gold medal at Eton Dorney, London in June. At the third round in Lucerne they finished fourth.

In July at the Henley Royal Regatta she teamed up with Polly Swann, Frances Houghton and Helen Glover to win the Princess Grace Challenge Cup for women's quadruple scull. Competing as Leander Club and Minerva Bath Rowing Club they completed the final course in 6 minutes 59 seconds.

References

External links
 
 Victoria Meyer-Laker at British Rowing

1988 births
Living people
Sportspeople from Barnstaple
Alumni of the University of Nottingham
English female rowers
Members of Leander Club
European Rowing Championships medalists